"Dream On" is a song recorded by the Scottish rock band Nazareth, and released on the studio album 2XS in 1982, and later as a single in early 1983. Initially written by Rankin and recorded as a demo in 1979, with an additional verse being penned by Charlton in 1982 during the recording of 2XS, "Dream On" became one of their most popular tracks. In 1987 Helix covered this song.

Charts

Year-end chart

References

1982 songs
1983 singles
Nazareth (band) songs
A&M Records singles
Vertigo Records singles
Rock ballads
Songs written by Dan McCafferty
Songs written by Darrell Sweet (musician)
Songs written by Manny Charlton
1980s ballads